Trigonostoma mozambicense is a species of sea snail, a marine gastropod mollusc in the family Cancellariidae, the nutmeg snails.

Description
The length of the shell attains 20 mm.

Distribution
This species occurs in the Indian Ocean off Mozambique.

References

External links
 

Cancellariidae
Gastropods described in 2002
Molluscs of the Indian Ocean
Invertebrates of Mozambique